Sycacantha regionalis is a species of moth of the family Tortricidae. It is found in the Democratic Republic of the Congo.

References

Moths described in 1934
Olethreutini
Sycacantha
Endemic fauna of the Democratic Republic of the Congo